The Republic of Martyazo was a short-lived secessionist state proclaimed by Hutu rebels at Vyanda in Burundi at the province of Makamba in the early May 1972 during the genocidal violence of 1972 as a bid to create a political base. At first, the state was located inside the mountainous Vugizo commune, between Makamba and Nyanza Lac. However, it quickly expanded to its surroundings, even reaching the border with Tanzania. 

A few days after the republic was declared, forces of the Tutsi-dominated government of Michel Micombero occupied the region, ending the rebellion and the existence of Martyazo. The number of people to have perished in the rebellion is believed to have ranged between 800 and 1200. Because of the nature of the government and the rebellion, many killed were Tutsi hostages held in plantations in the area tried by the self-proclaimed "people's courts" established in the secessionist state.

Academics have dubbed the state "mysterious" and "ephemeral" because of a lack of reliable information on it. Owing to its life span of little more than a week, no formal government structures were ever established in Martyazo.

Notes

References

Further reading
 Jean-Pierre Chrétien & Jean-François Dupaquier, Burundi 1972, au bord des génocides, pp. 89–91.

Former countries in Africa
States and territories established in 1972
States and territories disestablished in 1972
Former unrecognized countries
Disputed territories in Africa
1972 in Burundi